SYR7: J'Accuse Ted Hughes is the seventh release in American group Sonic Youth's SYR series. It was released only on vinyl—the first in the series to receive no compact disc release—and featured two songs: "J'Accuse Ted Hughes", and "Agnès B. Musique". It consists of an improvised piece performed live during the band's April 8, 2000 performance at the first All Tomorrow's Parties festival, followed by an unused soundtrack for an Agnes B. fashion show.

SYR7 followed the SYR series tradition of liner notes in foreign languages, in this case, Arpitan, a French regional language. The cover art comes from a negative Melody Maker review of the band's ATP performance, referencing previous SYR record Goodbye 20th Century with the headline "Goodbye 20th Century, goodbye talent!"

Track listing

References 

2008 albums
Sonic Youth albums
Sonic Youth Recordings albums
Ted Hughes